Satyanarayan is another name of Vishnu.

Satyanarayan may also refer to:

 Satyanarayan Singh (disambiguation), multiple people
 Ulhas Koravi Satyanarayan, Indian basketball player

See also
 Satyanarayana (disambiguation)